Vladimir Voronin (born 25 May 1941) is a Moldovan politician. He was the third president of Moldova from 2001 until 2009 and has been the First Secretary of the Party of Communists of the Republic of Moldova (PCRM) since 1994. He was Europe's first democratically elected communist party head of state after the dissolution of the Eastern Bloc.

Family and education 
Vladimir Nicolaevici Voronin was born in the village of Corjova, located that time in the Romanian-administrated Transnistria Governorate. Despite his Russified name, his ethnic origins are Romanian. Although Voronin is a lifelong communist who pursued unfriendly policies towards Romania at various times during the 2000s, his grandfather Isidor Sârbu was an anticommunist fighter in Romania after 1944. Voronin's mother, Pelagheia Bujeniță, died on 2 July 2005.

Voronin graduated from the Cooperation Tekhnikum (Kooperativny tekhnikum) of Chișinău (1961), the All-Union Institute for Food Industry (1971), the Academy of Social Sciences of the Central Committee of the Communist Party of the Soviet Union (1983), and the Academy of the Ministry of Internal Affairs of the Soviet Union (1991).

Early career
He began working in 1961 as the head of a bakery in the town of Criuleni. From 1966 until 1971, Voronin held the offices of vice-director of the bread factory in Criuleni and head of the bread factory in Dubăsari.

After 1971, he was active in the state administration of the Moldavian SSR, being in turn a member of the Dubăsari and Ungheni township executive committees, of the Ungheni District Executive Committee, and, starting 1983, inspector and vice-director of the Organization Section of the Central Committee of the Moldavian branch of the Communist Party of the Soviet Union. In 1985, he was appointed head of section in the Council of Ministers of the Moldavian SSR. Between 1985 and 1989, Voronin served as first secretary of the Bender City Committee of the Communist Party. Between 1988 and 1990, he held the office of the Minister of Internal Affairs of the Moldovan SSR. In this capacity he advocated against the use of force to quell anti-Soviet popular demonstrations on 7 and 10 November 1989, a regretful reference to which he made when addressing the country on TV on 8 April 2009 after anti-government protests were quelled by the police. Voronin was also a member of the Supreme Soviet of the Moldavian SSR of 10th and 11th legislatures.

In 1993, Voronin became the co-president of the Organizational Committee for the creation of the Party of Communists of the Republic of Moldova (PCRM). He played a central role in reviving the Communist Party after it was banned in 1991–1993. In 1994 he was elected President of the PCRM. He was a candidate for the post of President of the now-independent Republic of Moldova at the 1996 elections. In the parliamentary election in March 1998, Vladimir Voronin was elected as a Member of Parliament. He then served as member of its Permanent Bureau and as president of the PCRM's parliamentary faction, which held 40 of 101 seats.

Voronin was nominated as Prime Minister of Moldova by President Petru Lucinschi in late 1999, but the nomination was unsuccessful because Voronin did not have enough support in parliament. In the parliamentary election in February 2001, he was again elected as a Member of Parliament.

Presidential career

First mandate

The PCRM won 50.07% of the vote and 71 of the 101 seats in the February 2001 parliamentary election; by this time the constitution had been changed to provide for election of the President through the Parliament rather than popular vote. In March the PCRM's Central Committee nominated Voronin as its presidential candidate at a plenum, and on 4 April 2001 Voronin was elected as President by the Parliament. Of the 89 deputies participating in the vote, 71 voted for Voronin, 15 voted for Dumitru Braghiş, and three voted for Valerian Cristea. He was sworn in at a ceremony in Chişinău on 7 April 2001. The Constitutional Court ruled that the President could also lead a political party, and Voronin was re-elected as the PCRM's leader.

Voronin maintained his commitment to the reduction of Moldova's chronic poverty by allocating more resources to social safety net items such as health, education, and increasing pensions and salaries. These measures helped to maintain support for his government, but Moldova still remained the poorest country in Europe throughout his presidency, with around 38% of GDP coming from remittances of Moldovans working abroad (2008). Voronin's tenure as President was marked by fluctuating relations with the International Monetary Fund (IMF) and the World Bank.

From January to April 2002, opposition forces organized large demonstrations in protest against several controversial government proposals, including expanded use of the Russian language in schools, and plans for its designation as a second official language. While the demonstrations were tense at times, the government did not use force and ultimately agreed to mediation by the Council of Europe.

During his visit to the United States (16-20 December 2002), Voronin met with  President Bush and issued a joint statement with him affirming the relationship between the two countries, and acknowledging the work Moldova needed to bring about reform and privatization.

In 2003, Voronin's government backtracked over signing a Russian-proposed federalization settlement with the breakaway region of Transnistria (Kozak memorandum). On the same year, Voronin claimed that "Romania has remained the only empire in Europe, consisting of Moldavia, Dobruja and Transylvania", provoking a diplomatic conflict with Romania and the President of Romania Ion Iliescu. In 2004, Voronin branded the leadership of Transnistria "a transnational criminal group", and ordered an economic blockade of Transnistria after its authorities closed several Romanian-speaking schools.

Second mandate 

In the parliamentary election in March 2005, the PCRM received 46.1% of the vote and won 56 seats in the 101-member Parliament — more than enough for the 51-vote minimum required to remain in government, but short of the 61 votes necessary to elect a president. However, President Voronin received the necessary support from the Christian Democratic People's Party, the Democratic and Social Liberal factions, after he promised to deliver on needed reforms and Euro-Atlantic integration for the country. (The latter two factions broke away from the Electoral Bloc "Moldova Democrată" following the election, leaving the Our Moldova Alliance (AMN) of the former Mayor of Chişinău Serafim Urechean as the second-largest party in Parliament, with 26 seats.) In the presidential election held in Parliament on 4 April 2005, Voronin was re-elected with 75 votes; another candidate, Gheorghe Duca, received one vote, and two votes were invalid.

Political agenda during tenure

The declared main goals of his political agenda were:
 Closer ties with the Russian Federation and "integration in Europe"; solving the Transnistria conflict; EU cooperation (and membership if possible); strong opposition to NATO membership; independence, as opposed to a unification with Romania.

Events of 2009 and resignation
After the parliamentary election held on 5 April 2009, the PCRM won 49.48% of the vote and 60 seats, one seat too few to elect a President. Voronin was elected Speaker of the Parliament and retained the Presidency of Moldova with an interim status. The police crackdown of the civil unrest in April 2009 antagonized the society, and the communists were unable to secure one additional vote out of the 41 MPs from the three opposition parties; a snap parliamentary election was necessary.

In the snap parliamentary election in July 2009, the PCRM won 44.69% of the vote, which is more votes than any other individual party, and gained 48 seats, but it lost its parliamentary majority to a coalition of opposition parties which has 53 seats. However, the opposition also failed to obtain enough seats to elect a President, thereby producing more uncertainty. Voronin announced on 2 September 2009 that he intended to resign, saying that his position as acting President had become "ambiguous and doubtful". He resigned on 11 September 2009. The President sent a letter to Parliament confirming his intention to resign. Mihai Ghimpu succeeded Voronin as acting president until a proper President could be elected.

Post-presidential years 
The pro-Western parliamentary majority on 29 December 2009 blocked Voronin's election to Moldova's permanent delegation at the Parliamentary Assembly of the Council of Europe in Strasbourg. In February 2010, Vladimir Voronin and his wife returned the diplomatic passports which they were keeping illegally.

According to the last opinion polls carried out in 2019 regarding the most popular politicians of the Republic of Moldova, Vladimir Voronin is ranked on the seventh position among the top of politicians which enjoyed the highest trust of Moldovans and according to some other polls he is ranked at the eighth position.

Political views
Voronin identifies himself as a left-wing politician, he is strongly conservative on social issues. He is against immigration and he rejects the building of mosques in Moldova, as well as LGBT rights. His remarks towards the African-born activist John Onoje ("They [the ruling parties] brought here a Negro, who'd just climbed down from a tree, and now he's doing politics for them.") are still regarded as controversial.

Despite the fact that his grandfather Isidor Sârbu emigrated to Romania, Voronin considers Moldovans and Romanians two different ethnic groups. Some of his declarations were considered anti-Romanian.

Personal life
Vladimir Voronin is married to Taisia Mihailovna (a Ukrainian) and has two children, a son Oleg and a daughter Valentina. Voronin's CV states he is an economist, engineer, political science graduate, and jurist by education. 
In October 2012, Voronin and his wife celebrated their golden marriage anniversary. He has the military rank of Major General from the former USSR Ministry of Internal Affairs (equivalent of NATO OF-6 Brigadier General – see Ranks and insignia of the Soviet military and Ranks and insignia of NATO). Some argue that he also holds Russian citizenship in addition to citizenship of the Republic of Moldova, because he used to receive a pension as a former Russian Ministry of Internal Affairs employee, from the time he lived as a private citizen in Moscow in 1991–1993. His son, Oleg Voronin, is arguably the richest businessman in Moldova. His daughter is a physician, but unlike Oleg not a public figure. On 19 February 2010, Voronin told journalists that the questioning of his son is an attempt of revenge against his family by the current authorities. Oleg is suspected of fiscal evasion and money laundering.

Honours and awards
 Knight Grand Cross of the Grand Order of King Tomislav ("For outstanding contribution to the development and improvement of relations between the Republic of Croatia and the Republic of Moldova and the promotion of the European idea and the project of European integration.", 21 March 2007)
 Order of Prince Yaroslav the Wise I degree (24 May 2006)
 Order of the Holy Blessed Governor Stefan cel Mare I degree (Orthodox Church of Moldova, 25 May 2006)
 Order of the Savior (13 June 2007)
 Grand Order of King Tomislav (Croatia, 17 February 2009)
 Order of the "Stara Planina" (Bulgaria, 12 March 2009)
 Order of the Cross of the Holy Sepulcher (Jerusalem Orthodox Church, 23 June 2009)
 Order of Holy Prince Daniel of Moscow (Russian Orthodox Church, 10 October 2011)

References

External links
 

1941 births
Living people
Presidents of Moldova
Presidents of the Moldovan Parliament
Moldovan Ministers of the Interior
Moldovan MPs 1998–2001
Moldovan MPs 2009
Moldovan MPs 2009–2010
Moldovan MPs 2014–2018
Communist Party of Moldavia politicians
Communist Party of the Soviet Union members
Party of Communists of the Republic of Moldova politicians
Recipients of the Order of Prince Yaroslav the Wise, 1st class
Anti-Romanian sentiment
Eurosceptics
Moldovan economists
Cooperation College of Chișinău alumni
People from Corjova, Dubăsari